Michael, Mick or Mike Higgins may refer to:
Mike Higgins (footballer) (1862–?), English footballer
Michael Higgins (glass artist) (1908–1999), American artist
Pinky Higgins (Michael Franklin Higgins, 1909–1969), American baseball player and manager
Mick Higgins (Australian footballer) (1911–1989), Australian rules footballer
Michael Higgins (actor) (1920–2008), stage actor best known for his performance in the 1974 Broadway production of Equus
Mick Higgins (1923–2010), Cavan Gaelic footballer and coach
Michael Higgins (priest) (born 1935), Anglican priest
Michael D. Higgins (born 1941), ninth President of Ireland
Michael W. Higgins (born 1948), Canadian academic and President of St Thomas University
John Michael Higgins (born 1963), American actor and voice actor
Mike Higgins (basketball) (born 1967), American professional basketball player
Michael Higgins (American football) (born 1987), American football tight end
Mike Higgins (Jersey politician)

See also
Michael S. Longuet-Higgins (1925–2016), British mathematician and oceanographer
Michael O'Higgins (disambiguation)